The lord of Mann is the lord proprietor and head of state of the Isle of Man. The current lord proprietor and head of state is Charles III. Before 1504 the head of state was known as King of Mann.

Relationship with the Crown
Since 1399, the kings and lords of Mann were vassals of the kings of England, and subsequently of Great Britain, who was the ultimate sovereign of the island. This right of 'lord proprietor' was revested into the Crown by the Isle of Man Purchase Act 1765 for £70,000 and a £2,000 annuity, and hence ceased to exist separately. King George III became the first British monarch to reign over the Isle of Man as Lord of Mann in 1765. For reasons of culture and tradition, the title Lord of Mann continues to be used. For these reasons, the correct formal usage, as used in the Isle of Man for the Loyal Toast, is The King, Lord of Mann. The term "the King, Lord of Mann" was also used when Charles III was proclaimed King on the Isle of Man.

The title "Lord" was used by Queen Elizabeth II. Queen Victoria was styled as Lady of Mann.

List

Before 1504
Before 1504, the ruler of the Isle of Man was generally styled King of Mann.

16th century
Thomas, Earl of Derby, 1504–1521
Edward, Earl of Derby, 1521–1572
Henry, Earl of Derby, 1572–1593
Ferdinando, Earl of Derby, 1593–1594

Succession dispute (1594–1607)
In 1598, a succession dispute between the daughters of Ferdinando and their uncle, William, Earl of Derby, was heard by the Privy Council. They decided that the right to the Isle of Man belonged solely to Queen Elizabeth I, and the letters patent of 1405 which conferred the lordship of the Isle of Man on the Stanley family were declared null and void as the previous ruler, Henry, Earl of Northumberland, had not been subject to legal attainder, despite his treason, and the 1405 and 1406 letters patent had therefore not taken effect.

The Queen, in consideration of the "many eminent services performed to herself and to her royal predecessors by the honourable and noble House of Stanley", withdrew her right and referred the contending claimants to the decision of the Privy Council as to the best claim of inheritance.

The Privy Council decided "the grant being by letters patent under the Great Seal of England, such right would descend according to the Common Law of England to the heirs general, and not to the heirs male", and the island was therefore awarded to Ferdinando's daughters; whereupon William agreed to purchase their several shares and interests.

Interim (1607–1609)
Following the resolution of the succession dispute, it was ruled that the daughters of Ferdinando Stanley were the rightful heirs. As the oldest of them would not reach the age of majority until 1609, two temporary Lords of Mann were appointed by James I by letters patent, so that the daughters could benefit from the Island's revenues.
Henry, Earl of Northampton, 1607–1608
Robert, Earl of Salisbury, 1608–1609

The original letters patent having been declared void, the Parliament of England in 1609 under James I passed a Private Act of Parliament entitled "An Act for assuring and establishing the Isle of Man in the name and blood of William, Earl of Derby" (1609) (7 Jas. 1 c. 4) which established the title in law as Lord of Mann. The lordship was conferred by letters patent dated 7 July 1609 upon William Stanley, 6th Earl of Derby. Subsequent succession was under the terms of this grant.

17th and 18th centuries
William Stanley, 6th Earl of Derby, 1609–1612
Elizabeth de Vere, Countess of Derby, 1612–1627
James Stanley, 7th Earl of Derby, 1627–1651 (known as the Great Stanley)
Thomas, Lord Fairfax of Cameron, 1651–1660 (appointed by Oliver Cromwell during the English Interregnum)
Charles Stanley, 8th Earl of Derby, 1660–1672 (restored by King Charles II)
William Richard George Stanley, 9th Earl of Derby, 1672–1702
James Stanley, 10th Earl of Derby, 1702–1736
James Murray, 2nd Duke of Atholl, 1736–1764
Charlotte, Duchess of Atholl and John, Duke of Atholl,  1764–1765

In 1736, on the death of James Stanley, 10th Earl of Derby, the Duke of Atholl, a maternal grandson of James Stanley, 7th Earl of Derby, succeeded to the sovereignty of the Isle of Man, while a more distant cousin  succeeded as Earl of Derby.

Revestment
In 1765, Charlotte Murray, Duchess of Atholl, 8th Baroness Strange, sold the suzerainty of the island to the British government for £70,000 and an annuity of £2,000 (£5,235,000 and £150,000 respectively in modern terms). By the passage of the Isle of Man Purchase Act 1765 the title of Lord of Mann was revested into the British Crown. It has therefore since been used in the Isle of Man to refer to the reigning British monarch.

George III, 1765–1820
George IV, 1820–1830
William IV, 1830–1837
Victoria, 1837–1901
Edward VII, 1901–1910
George V, 1910–1936
Edward VIII, 1936
George VI, 1936–1952
Elizabeth II, 1952–2022
Charles III, since 2022

In 1828, all remaining property interests and rights of the dukes of Atholl on the island were sold to HM Treasury, a department of the British government, for the sum of £417,144, .
This was accomplished by two Private Acts of Parliament:

 "An Act empowering the Lords of the Treasury to Purchase all the Manorial Rights of the Duke of Atholl in the Isle of Man" [c. 34] 10 June 1824
 "An Act to empower the Commissioners of His Majesty’s Treasury to purchase a certain Annuity in respect of Duties and Customs levied in the Isle of Man, and any reserved sovereign rights in the said Island belonging to John Duke of Atholl" [c. 34] 10 June 1825

Lieutenant Governor
The Lord of Mann is now represented by the Lieutenant Governor of the Isle of Man.

See also
 Governor of the Isle of Man
 History of the Isle of Man
 Isle of Man Purchase Act 1765
 Lieutenant Governor of the Isle of Man
 Noble and royal titles of the Isle of Man
 List of Manx royal consorts

References

Lists of office-holders
Isle of Man-related lists
 Lord
Noble titles of the Isle of Man
Heads of state